This article details the matches played by the Venezuela national football team from 2000 to 2019.

Fixtures and results

2000

2001

2002

2003

2004

2005

2006

2007

2008

2009

2010

2011

2012

2013

2014

2015

2016

2017

2018

2019

2020

References

Venezuela national football team results